Happy Valley Tea Estate  is a tea garden in Darjeeling district in the Indian state of West Bengal. Established in 1854, it is Darjeeling's second oldest tea estate.

History

David Wilson, an Englishman, had named the garden Wilson Tea Estate and by 1860 had started cultivation of tea. In 1903, the estate was taken over by an Indian, Tarapada Banerjee, an aristocrat from Hooghly. In 1929, Banerjee bought the Windsor Tea Estate nearby, and merged the two estates under the name of Happy Valley Tea Estate. G.C. Banerjee was the next owner of Happy Valley Tea Estate. He with his wife Annapurna Devi and three daughters (Nonimukhi, Monmaya and Savitri) lived there for some time. Annapurna Devi was related to the Ganguly family of Khandwa; her maternal uncle was Kunjalal Bihari, father of the famous cine Gangulys. Nandini Balial (Ganguly), a young prolific writer in LA is the great granddaughter of Late Monmaya Debi.

In March 2007, after remaining nearly dormant for nearly four years as the tea industry had experienced a slump, the estate was bought over by S K Bansal, of Ambootia Tea Group, which established a new factory within the premises, and started modernization process, replating and switching to organic farming. Finally, the estate reopened to public in 2008, with the original factory turned into a working museum. It also displayed single piston slow-speed engines, and the shaft machines and sells tea-related mementos. Today, over 1500 people worked in the tea estate and processing unit.

Overview

The bushes in the garden are very old — the minimum age is 80 years, and some are 150 years old. Very little re-plantation has been done in the recent past. Situated around 3 km north of town, below Hill Cart Road, accessible via Lochnager Road from Chowk Bazaar, this tea estate is the closest tea estate to Darjeeling town, and tourists often visit the garden. The months of March to May are the busiest time here. when plucking and processing are in progress. It is open Tuesday to Saturday from 8 a.m. to 4:30 p.m.

DOTEPL group
The gardens of the Darjeeling Organic Tea Estates Private Ltd. are: Ambootia, Changtong, Happy Valley, Monteviot, Moondakotee, Mullootar, Nagri, Noorbong, Sepoydhurah (Chamling), Sivitar, Rangmook Ceder, Rangaroon, Pandam and Aloobari.

References
 
Chattopadhyay S.S. The valley of resilience. Frontline. Volume 20– Issue 25, 6–19 December 2003.

External links
 

Tea estates in Darjeeling district
1854 establishments in India
1854 establishments in British India